The LVIII Legislature of the Congress of Mexico met from September 1, 2000, to August 31, 2003. All members of the LVIII Legislature were elected in the elections of July 2000.

Senators of the LVIII Legislature

By state

Plurinominal Senators

Deputies of the LVIII Legislature

By state

Plurinominal Deputies

Congress of Mexico by session